Postplatyptilia zongoensis is a moth of the family Pterophoridae. It is known throughout Bolivia.

The wingspan is about 27 mm. Adults are on wing in April.

Etymology
The name reflects the river valley where it occurs, the Zongo River valley.

References

zongoensis
Fauna of Bolivia
Moths of South America
Insects of South America
Moths described in 2006